Claiford A. Arao (born October 29, 1984) is a Filipino professional basketball coach and former player. He was the fourteenth overall draft pick by Meralco in the 2010 PBA draft. He played for the Ateneo Blue Eagles during his collegiate career, in which he now serves as an assistant coach.

Arao played only one game in the Philippine Basketball Association (PBA), playing for the Meralco Bolts in three minutes, without registering anything from that lone game.

In 2016, Arao returned to playing competitive basketball as he signed with Byaheng SCTEX of the Pilipinas Commercial Basketball League.

PBA career statistics

Season-by-season averages

|-
| align=left | 
| align=left | Meralco
| 1 || 3.0 || .000 || .000 || .000 || .0 || .0 || .0 || .0 || .0
|-
| align=center colspan=2 | Career
| 1 || 3.0 || .000 || .000 || .000 || .0 || .0 || .0 || .0 || .0

References

1984 births
Living people
Centers (basketball)
Filipino men's basketball coaches
Filipino men's basketball players
Meralco Bolts players
San Beda University alumni
NLEX Road Warriors coaches
Place of birth missing (living people)
Power forwards (basketball)
Ateneo Blue Eagles men's basketball players
Meralco Bolts draft picks
Ateneo Blue Eagles men's basketball coaches